Ángeles Montolio was the defending champion, but lost in the first round to María Sánchez Lorenzo.

Åsa Svensson won the title by defeating Iva Majoli 6–3, 4–6, 6–1 in the final.

Seeds
The first two seeds received a bye to the second round.

Draw

Finals

Top half

Bottom half

References

External links
 Official results archive (ITF)
 Official results archive (WTA)

Croatian Bol Ladies Open - Singles
Croatian Bol Ladies Open